Courmont may refer to the following places in France:

 Courmont, Aisne, a commune in the department of Aisne
 Courmont, Haute-Saône, a commune in the department of Haute-Saône